Eudolium is a genus of large sea snails, marine gastropod mollusks in the family Tonnidae, the tun shells.

Species
Species within the genus Eudolium include:
 † Eudolium aoteanum Beu, 1970 
 Eudolium bairdii (Verrill & Smith in Verrill, 1881)
 Eudolium crosseanum (di Monterosato, 1869)
Species brought into synonymy 
 Eudolium aulacodes Tomlin, 1927: synonym of  Oocorys sulcata P. Fischer, 1884
 Eudolium inflatum Kuroda & Habe, 1952: synonym of Eudolium bairdii (Verrill & Smith in Verrill, 1881)
 Eudolium javanum (K. Martin, 1879) : synonym of Eudolium crosseanum (Monterosato, 1869) (Recombined synonym)
 Eudolium kuroharai Azuma, 1960: synonym of Eudolium bairdii (Verrill & Smith in Verrill, 1881)
 Eudolium lineatum Osima, 1943: synonym of Eudolium bairdii (Verrill & Smith in Verrill, 1881)
 Eudolium pyriforme (Sowerby, 1914): synonym of Eudolium crosseanum (Monterosato, 1869) (Recombined synonym)
 Eudolium solidior (Dautzenberg & Fischer, 1906): synonym of Eudolium bairdii (Verrill & S. Smith, 1881) (Recombined synonym)
 Eudolium testardi (Montrouzier, 1863): synonym of Tonna cumingii (Reeve, 1849) (erroneous recombination)
 Eudolium thompsoni McGinty, 1955: synonym of Eudolium crosseanum (di Monterosato, 1869)

References

 Gofas, S.; Le Renard, J.; Bouchet, P. (2001). Mollusca, in: Costello, M.J. et al. (Ed.) (2001). European register of marine species: a check-list of the marine species in Europe and a bibliography of guides to their identification. Collection Patrimoines Naturels, 50: pp. 180–213 
 Vos, C. (2007). A conchological Iconography (No. 13) - The family Tonnidae. 123 pp., 30 numb. plus 41 (1 col.) un-numb. text-figs, 33 maps., 63 col. pls, Conchbooks, Germany page(s): 18
 Severns, M. (2011). Shells of the Hawaiian Islands - The Sea Shells. Conchbooks, Hackenheim. 564 pp.
 Vos, C. (2012) Overview of the Tonnidae (MOLLUSCA: GASTROPODA) in Chinese waters. Shell Discoveries 1(1); pp. 12–22; Pls. 1-9
 Vos, C. (2013) Overview of the Tonnidae (Mollusca: Gastropoda) in Chinese waters. Gloria Maris 52(1-2); pp. 22–53; Pls. 1-9

External links
 Dall W.H. 1889. Reports on the results of dredging, under the supervision of Alexander Agassiz, in the Gulf of Mexico (1877-78) and in the Caribbean Sea (1879-80), by the U.S. Coast Survey Steamer "Blake", Lieut.-Commander C.D. Sigsbee, U.S.N., and Commander J.R. Bartlett, U.S.N., commanding. XXIX. Report on the Mollusca. Part 2, Gastropoda and Scaphopoda. Bulletin of the Museum of Comparative Zoölogy at Harvard College, 18: 1-492, pls. 10-40
 Marshall, B. A. (1992). A revision of the Recent species of Eudolium Dall, 1889 (Gastropoda: Tonnoidea). The Nautilus. 106(1): 24-38

Tonnidae